The Government's Obligation to Protect the Nuclear Rights and Achievements of Iranian Nation Act is a bill that was passed on 23 June 2015 by Iran's Islamic Consultative Assembly to support Iran's nuclear program and put some constraints on Iranian President Hassan Rouhani in the negotiations leading to the Joint Comprehensive Plan of Action.

The bill passed in the Majlis by 213 to 10 (Yea and Nay) and 6 Abstains.

The implication of the Act is that the Majlis curtailed its own power to stand against the deal.

Content 
The main requirements for the government include:
All Sanctions against Iran must be lifted on the day that Iran begins to implement its obligations.
The International Atomic Energy Agency is restricted to conventional inspections of Nuclear facilities in Iran and barred from seeing military bases, security sensitive sites, documents and scientists, and must comply with Supreme National Security Council policies.
No restrictions on Iran’s acquisition of peaceful nuclear technology and know-how or research and development, and must be in compliance with Supreme National Security Council policies.

The bill has two amendments:
According to Articles 77 and 125 of the Constitution of the Islamic Republic of Iran, results of negotiations must be submitted to Majlis.
Ministry of Foreign Affairs and Supreme National Security Council must report implementation of the agreement every six months to Majlis.

See also 
 Iran Nuclear Agreement Review Act of 2015, passed by the United States Congress
 Majlis special commission for examining the JCPOA

References 

2015 in Iran
Presidency of Hassan Rouhani
Nuclear program of Iran
Law of Iran